The National Blues Museum is a 501(c)(3) non-profit museum in St. Louis, Missouri, United States, dedicated to exploring the musical history and impact of the blues. It exists as an entertainment and educational resource focusing on blues music. The Museum offers a rotating collection of exhibits, live performances in the Lumiere Place Legends room, and is available for private events.

History
The museum opened in 2016. Surly  King, the daughter of B.B. King, spoke at the museum opening.  The museum cost $14 million to create in a renovated historic building in downtown St. Louis. Original branding, graphic design and website were provided by the agency, Project 13.

See also

 List of music museums
 Delta Blues Museum

References

External links
 National Blues Museum website
 Project 13 website

Music museums in the United States
Blues organizations
Museums in St. Louis
Museums established in 2016
Downtown St. Louis
2016 establishments in Missouri
Buildings and structures in St. Louis
Tourist attractions in St. Louis